Khánh An is a commune (xã) in U Minh District, Cà Mau Province, southern Vietnam. 
The commune is 14 km by road northwest of the provincial capital, Cà Mau. The commune has an area of 155.98 km2, population 14,017 inhabitants (2008). The commune contains 10 villages (ap).
The commune is adjacent to Lower U Minh National Park, a low wetland area.

Notes

Communes of Cà Mau province